Himshikhar Television (Nepali: हिमशिखर टेलिभिजन) is a private television station based in Damak, in the Eastern Region of Nepal and Kathmandu the capital city of Nepal. It was established in 2010 and started full phase broadcasting on January 19, 2011, under a terrestrial and cable television transmission license. It has offered programming on human rights and social issues, highlighted tourism places and area of prosperity, along with analysis on aspects of economic development in the Eastern Development Region.

References

Television channels in Nepal
2011 establishments in Nepal